Wang Xianghao, Shianghao Wang, or Shianghaw Wang (5 May 1915 – 4 May 1993) was a Chinese mathematician who introduced the Grunwald–Wang theorem in , correcting an error in Wilhelm Grunwald's  original statement and proof of this. He later changed from mathematics to computer science and control theory, and became a member of the Chinese Academy of Sciences.

References

1915 births
1993 deaths
20th-century Chinese mathematicians
Educators from Hebei
Academic staff of Jilin University
Mathematicians from Hebei
Members of the Chinese Academy of Sciences
Academic staff of Peking University
People from Hengshui
National University of Peking alumni